Trnje is a village in the Municipality of Črenšovci in the Prekmurje region of northeastern Slovenia. Črnec Creek, a tributary of the Ledava, flows through the settlement.

References

External links
Trnje on Geopedia

Populated places in the Municipality of Črenšovci